Žužek is a Slovene surname. Notable people with the surname include:

Ivan Žužek (1924–2004), Slovenian Jesuit priest and Canonist
Suzie Zuzek (1920–2011), American textile designer of Yugoslav descent
Žan Žužek (born 1997), Slovenian footballer

Slovene-language surnames